Harry Salmon may refer to:

 Harry Salmon (baseball) (1895–1983), American baseball pitcher in the Negro leagues
 Harry Salmon (businessman) (1881–1950), British businessman
 Harry Morrey Salmon (1892–1985), naturalist and bird photographer